Pathagollapalle is a village in Kadapa district, located in Rayachoti mandal of Andhra Pradesh, India. The village is 3 kilometers far from Rayachoti. It has been recently added to the Rayachoti Municipality.

Villages in Kadapa district